John E. Mullally (October 22, 1874 – January 15, 1912) was an assassinated American politician and saloon owner. He was elected to the California State Assembly from the 30th District in San Francisco, from 1911 to 1912.

Biography 
Mullally was born in San Francisco the first son and third child of John Mullally and Ellen Lannen Mullally. He attended public schools, and St. Joseph College.

He was a Republican. He was listed by the Asiatic Exclusion League as being supportive of their cause.

His life was cut short on January 15, 1912, when three people disguised as soldiers from the Presidio, who had been conducting a string of robberies chose the saloon he owned at 116 Eighth Street as their next target. Mullally attempted to resist, and each of the three shot him. His bartender exchanged gunfire with the three, who fled with $87. Mullally's wife, and brother James, a fireman at a neighboring station, stayed with him until an ambulance took him to a nearby hospital, where he died while anesthesia was being administered.

He was buried at Holy Cross Cemetery in Colma, California.

In Fiction
Mullally is a major character in a time travel/alternate history story, "Timely Misadventure" appearing in the book Altered Times surviving the attack and later elected President.

References

External links

Republican Party members of the California State Assembly
20th-century American politicians
Saloonkeepers
Politicians from San Francisco
1874 births
1912 deaths
Assassinated American politicians
Deaths by firearm in California
Burials at Holy Cross Cemetery (Colma, California)
1910s assassinated politicians